Hypselonotus lineatus is a species of leaf-footed bug in the family Coreidae. It is found in Costa Rica, Ecuador, Panama, and Nicaragua.

References

Coreini
Insects described in 1803